Rolf Schläfli (born March 15, 1971) is a retired male decathlete from Switzerland. He set his personal best score (8019 points) at the 2003 Hypo-Meeting in Götzis, Austria. Schläfli is a two-time national champion in the men's decathlon (1995 and 1998).

Achievements

References

1971 births
Living people
Swiss decathletes